Lorraine Daston (born June 9, 1951 in East Lansing, Michigan) is an American historian of science. Director emerita of the Max Planck Institute for the History of Science (MPIWG) in Berlin, and visiting professor in the Committee on Social Thought at the University of Chicago, she is an authority on Early Modern European scientific and intellectual history. In 1993, she was named a fellow of the American Academy of Arts and Sciences. She is a permanent fellow at the Berlin Institute for Advanced Study.

Education
Study of history and science at Harvard University (BA 1973 summa cum laude)
diploma in history and philosophy of science Univ. of Cambridge (1974)
PhD in the history of science Harvard Univ. (1979), supervised by I. Bernard Cohen

Scholarly activities 
Daston divides her year between a nine-month period in Berlin, and a three-month period in Chicago, where she usually teaches a seminar and assists doctoral students.

Daston was appointed the inaugural Humanitas Professor in the History of Ideas at University of Oxford for 2013. She has also held Oxford's Isaiah Berlin Visiting Professorship in Intellectual History. In 2002, she delivered two Tanner Lectures at Harvard University, in which she traced theoretical conceptions of nature in several literary and philosophical works. In 2006 she gave the British Academy's Master-Mind Lecture.

She is on the editorial board of Critical Inquiry.

Daston was awarded the Order of Merit of the Federal Republic of Germany in 2010. She was elected to the American Philosophical Society in 2017. In 2018 she received the Dan David Prize. She is married to the German psychologist and social scientist Gerd Gigerenzer.

Bibliography

 Classical Probability in the Enlightenment (1988)
 "The Ideal and Reality of the Republic of Letters in the Enlightenment" (1993)
 Wonders and the Order of Nature, 1150–1750 (with Katharine Park, 1998)
 "Objectivity and the Escape from Perspective" (1999)
 Biographies of Scientific Objects (co-editor, 2000)
 Eine kurze Geschichte der wissenschaftlichen Aufmerksamkeit (2001)
 Wunder, Beweise und Tatsachen: zur Geschichte der Rationalität (2001)
 "The Morality of Natural Orders: The Power of Medea" and "Nature's Customs versus Nature's Laws" (Tanner Lectures at Harvard University, 2002)
 The Moral Authority of Nature (co-editor, 2003)
 "The Disciplines of Attention," in David E. Wellbery, ed., A New History of German Literature (Cambridge, MA: Harvard University Press Reference Library, 2005)
  "Condorcet and the Meaning of Enlightenment" (Lecture at McGill University, 2006)
 Objectivity (with Peter Galison, Boston: Zone Books, 2007)
 Natural Law and Laws of Nature in Early Modern Europe (co-editor,  Aldershot: Ashgate, 2008)
 "Rules Rule: How Enlightenment Reason Became Cold War Rationality"  (Video of Lecture at Wissenschaftskolleg zu Berlin, 2010)
 Histories of scientific observation (with Elizabeth Lunbeck, Chicago; London: University of Chicago Press, 2011)
 Before the Two Cultures: Big Science and Big Humanities in the Nineteenth Century (Proceedings of the Israel Academy of Sciences and Humanities, Volume IX, No. 1. 2015)
 Against Nature (2019)
 
 Rules: A Short History of What We Live By (Princeton University Press, 2022)

References

External links
Lorraine Daston MPIWG profile page
The Observer (Article about Daston in MaxPlanckResearch, magazine of the Max Planck Society 2012

Living people
Historians of science
Knights Commander of the Order of Merit of the Federal Republic of Germany
Recipients of the Pour le Mérite (civil class)
Intellectual historians
University of Chicago faculty
1951 births
American women historians
Fellows of the American Academy of Arts and Sciences
Members of the American Philosophical Society
Members of the German Academy of Sciences Leopoldina
Corresponding Fellows of the British Academy
Harvard University alumni
Alumni of the University of Cambridge
21st-century American women
Scientific American people
Max Planck Institute directors
People from East Lansing, Michigan